Živan Đurišić is a politician in Serbia. He is a member of the Serbian Progressive Party, currently serving his second term in the National Assembly of Serbia.

Private career
Đurišić was a municipal court judge in Velika Plana. He is now retired.

Political career
Đurišić received the 140th position on the Progressive Party's Let's Get Serbia Moving coalition electoral list in the 2012 Serbian parliamentary election. The list won seventy-three seats, and he was not elected. He was promoted to the ninety-fifth position on the successor Aleksandar Vučić — Future We Believe In list for the 2014 parliamentary election and was elected to his first term when the list won a landslide victory with 158 out of 250 mandates. For the next two years, he served with the government's parliamentary majority.

He was given the 145th position on the Progressive-led list in the 2016 parliamentary election. The list won a second consecutive majority with 131 seats. Đurišić was not immediately re-elected, but he was awarded a new mandate on June 7, 2018, as a replacement for Željko Sušec, who had resigned.

References

1947 births
Living people
People from Velika Plana
Members of the National Assembly (Serbia)
Serbian Progressive Party politicians